Craig Smith (born 26 February 1973) is an Australian former professional rugby league footballer who played in the 1990s.

Biography
Smith made his first grade rugby league debut for North Sydney Bears in 1995, playing two games late in the season, including the Bears' qualifying final defeat.
Joining Canterbury-Bankstown Bulldogs during Super League, Smith scored 20 points in the Bulldogs' 1997 reserve grade premiership win over Auckland Warriors, before signing a two-year contract to play with Melbourne Storm, who entered the NRL in 1998.

Smith was Melbourne Storm's leading point-scorer in the club's debut year (110 points), but had to sit on the sidelines for much of 1999 due to the good form of Matt Geyer. Smith trained in Melbourne, but flew back to Brisbane on weekends to play with the Storm's feeder club, Norths Devils, in the Queensland Cup competition.

Anderson also made Smith the primary goal-kicker. Smith's boot proved the difference in three sudden-death victories, culminating in his three goals and penalty try from the wing in the 1999 NRL Grand Final.

Smith rejected Melbourne's offer for the 2000 NRL season and retired.  He now lives back in Melbourne working in property maintenance with two kids Jack and isabella Smith
.In 2017, Smith spoke about his time in rugby league saying "We were walking around in Melbourne and were three times the size of everyone else, that is how they knew who the rugby league players were back then, nobody knew anything about the sport. At our first game they were cheering and I don’t think they knew what they were cheering about".

Statistics

NRL
 Statistics are correct to the end of career

References

1973 births
Living people
Australian rugby league players
Melbourne Storm players
North Sydney Bears players
Norths Devils players
Rugby league wingers
Rugby league players from Armidale, New South Wales